Thomas Roger Carroll (18 August 1942 – 16 August 2020) was an Irish international footballer.

Carroll was born in Dublin, and was 15 when he made his debut for Shelbourne, alongside his elder brother Eddie. During seven years at Tolka Park he won the League of Ireland Championship and the FAI Cup.

He moved to Cambridge City in August 1964 and played in the first ever Republic of Ireland U23 game in 1966. He then moved to Ipswich Town in July 1966 and played for the club at right full back for six seasons, including winning the 2nd Division title under the management of Bill McGarry before falling out with Bobby Robson. He was replaced by Geoff Hammond and soon after moved on to Birmingham City in November 1971.

He represented his country 17 times scoring once. He also won three amateur caps.

He managed Shels for most of the 1975/76 season following the departure of the long-serving Gerry Doyle. In December 1976 he was appointed player/manager of Athlone Town in succession to Trevor Hockey.

Carroll's death at the age of 77 was reported on 16 August 2020.

Honours
League of Ireland
 Shelbourne 1961/62
FAI Cup
 Shelbourne 1963

References

http://www.thehardtackle.com/2014/sir-bobby-robson-an-awakining-of-a-town-and-the-glory-that-followed-after/

Sources
 The Complete Who's Who of Irish International Football, 1945-96 (1996):Stephen McGarrigle [2]

1942 births
2020 deaths
Birmingham City F.C. players
Ipswich Town F.C. players
Republic of Ireland association footballers
Republic of Ireland international footballers
Republic of Ireland under-23 international footballers
Association footballers from Dublin (city)
League of Ireland players
Shelbourne F.C. players
Cambridge City F.C. players
League of Ireland managers
Shelbourne F.C. managers
Athlone Town A.F.C. managers
Shamrock Rovers F.C. guest players
English Football League players
Association football defenders
Republic of Ireland football managers